Cuspidaria vicdani  is a species of marine bivalve mollusc in the family Cuspidariidae.

Original description
     Poppe G.T. & Tagaro S. (2016). New marine mollusks from the central Philippines in the families Aclididae, Chilodontidae, Cuspidariidae, Nuculanidae, Nystiellidae, Seraphsidae and Vanikoridae. Visaya. 4(5): 83-103.
page(s): 85.

References

External links
 Worms Link

Cuspidariidae